Aur Pyar Ho Gaya (English: And Love Happened) is a 1997 Indian Hindi romance film directed by Rahul Rawail and starring Bobby Deol and Aishwarya Rai. This film marked the Hindi debut for Aishwarya Rai. The film's music was composed by Nusrat Fateh Ali Khan, who also makes a cameo appearance in the film. He died only a day after the film's release.

Plot
Ashi is a free-spirited young woman who was born and raised in a very traditional and conservative Indian family who prefer arranged marriages to love-marriages. Now, as she is twenty-five years old - her family has arranged her marriage to Rohit Malhotra, son of family friends, now established in business and thus, will be residing permanently in Switzerland as - Mr. & Mrs. Malhotra.

Respecting her father's guidance and wishes/customs, Ashi agrees to the marriage proposal, on the condition that she be allowed to meet her fiancé Rohit anonymously and get a chance to closely observe his character and personality. Ashi's father obliges to this condition and Ashi soon sets off to Switzerland to meet the potential suitor - Rohit Malhotra.

While she is there, she learns that Rohit is away on an emergency business meeting and nobody can say exactly when he is expected to return, so Ashi  stays in Switzerland for a few months - waiting for him, and in the meanwhile she  meets a man called Bobby, who is smitten by her beauty and makes friends with her. He soon finds out from her that she is frustrated in her failed attempt to meet Rohit. Later after a week, Bobby cannot help himself as his heart pines for her as his wife, so he disguises himself as Rohit and tells her that he is the Rohit she has been searching/waiting for all these months!

Ashi is happy that at last, she gets a chance to meet Rohit before marriage, even though it was not as she planned (as anonymous), and after a few more weeks, Ashi begins to love this new character, but then she finds out from Rohit's accomplices that Rohit is still on his emergency trip and therefore, Bobby's real identity- that he is Bobby, not Rohit. Anyway, she does not care and laughs it all off as she is already in love with Bobby and is ready to move on in life.

Upon their return to India, Ashi explains to her family that she met Bobby instead of Rohit and wants to marry Bobby, not Rohit. Ashi's family are at first, reluctant but then immediately after a few weeks, Bobby's family comes with a marriage proposal for Ashi.

As the two families meet, greet and agree for the preparations of the soon-to-be marriage, Bobby's mother introduces herself as the bank manager of the Bank in which Ashi’s father (Kailashnath) is involved in a fraud/embezzlement, Bank robbery case for which a trial is on-going.

In the coming months before the wedding takes place, Kailashnath is summoned to appear before the Court in relation to a major fraud case and scandal involving the bank robbery - in which Bobby's mother testifies that Kailashnath is one of the ringleaders.

When the story gets this far, Kailashnath immediately and furiously cancels his daughter Ashi's marriage to Bobby. Furthermore, he arranges Ashi's marriage to Rohit.

After a whole other twist to the film, the story ends up happily with Ashi marrying her soulmate Bobby, not Rohit.

Cast
Bobby Deol as Bobby Oberoi 
Aishwarya Rai as Ashi Kapoor
Beena Banerjee as Bobby Oberoi's mother (Banker)
Shammi Kapoor as Dadaji Kailashnath
Shammi as Dadiji Kailashnath
Anupam Kher as Kailashnath Ashi's father.
Aashif Sheikh as Rohit Malhotra
Avtar Gill as Mr. Malhotra, Rohit's father.
Priya Tendulkar as Mrs. Malhotra, Rohit's mother.
 Dimple Inamdar
Nusrat Fateh Ali Khan as himself (special appearance)
Sunny Deol as himself (special appearance)
Deepak Sharma as himself (special appearance)

Soundtrack

The music for all the songs were composed by Nusrat Fateh Ali Khan with lyrics were penned by Javed Akhtar.

Awards
Star Screen Awards
 Won Star Screen Award Most Promising Newcomer - Female - Aishwarya Rai Bachchan

References

External links
 

1997 films
1990s Hindi-language films
Films directed by Rahul Rawail
1997 romantic drama films
Indian romantic drama films
Films scored by Nusrat Fateh Ali Khan